Terajima (written: 寺島 or 寺嶋; sometimes read Terashima) is a Japanese surname. Notable people with the surname include:

Ken Terajima
Shinobu Terajima (born 1972), Japanese actress
Susumu Terajima (born 1963), Japanese actor
Yuji Terajima (born 1974), Japanese manga artist

Japanese-language surnames